Diner Dash: Hometown Hero is the fourth installment in the Diner Dash series of casual games. It was developed and published by PlayFirst. it was launched on September 25, 2007.

Story 
Flo returns to her hometown to visit her Grandma, Florence, only to find the place having turned into a run-down ghost town. Flo decides to use her culinary skills to rejuvenate the town by improving the eateries at all the formerly popular hangouts.

Flo and Grandma begin with the zoo, only to discover the zoo is now desolate. They head to the cafe, but are appalled at the service. The cafe waiter tells them that the reason for the zoo's poor state is recent funding cuts by the city. The two rejuvenate the zoo and it becomes successful again.

Flo and Grandma then head to the baseball park to watch a game, but attendance is poor. The park's diner is lackluster too, as Flo and Grandma hear a customer complain about the hot dog he waited for 30 minutes having turned cold. They then revive the baseball park and bring it to its former glory.

Flo and Grandma visit the museum and find it in a state of depression. Flo's favorite dinosaur fossil is gone. The janitor is all alone, as he has to work as the curator, and the grill's cook and waiter, all at the same time. Flo and Grandma then revive the museum with the help of the customers and the museum celebrates its grand reopening.

Flo and Grandma later go to the Boardwalk Beach. During the trip, Grandma Florence tells Flo about the discotheque she used to own when she was younger. When Flo notices an old building, which was apparently the aforementioned disco, Grandma says that she was unable to keep it afloat, and all that is left now is a parking lot. Flo and Grandma head to a shack at the park for a funnel cake, but decide to help the poorly managed waiters when they see how bad the amusement park has got.

Once the amusement park has been successfully restored, Flo decides to take a ride on the park's rollercoaster before leaving and ends up warping back in time. Flo finds herself in the 70's and discovers Grandma Florence's disco. She runs inside, where she meets a younger Florence in her 30's. Flo then resolves to help Florence keep her eatery afloat by helping her.

After helping Florence, Flo says goodbye, runs back to the rollercoaster, and warps back to the present time. When Flo encounters Grandma Florence in the present, she tells her about the disco and discovers that Florence's Groovy Disco is up and running. Grandma tells Flo that a woman who looks very familiar to her had helped her. Flo and Grandma Florence enter the disco and celebrate its anniversary.

Gameplay 
Gameplay involves seating customers as they enter the restaurant. One must drag and drop each group of customers to a table appropriate for their group size. Extra points are given for seating a customer in a chair that is the same color as the customer's clothing. Then, Flo must take their orders, send the order to the kitchen, deliver the food, give the group the check, and clean the table for new customers. There is hardly ever only one group of customers at a time, so the player must use time management in order to keep all of the customers happy. Each group of customers has a row of hearts at their table in order to show their mood. If the mood drops low enough, the customers will leave and players lose money. However, if the customers remain happy, they will stay and tip well. Each level has a money goal that one must reach in order to continue on to the next level.  As the player moves from level to level, they are able to select new upgrades for the restaurant. New elements are also added such as spills or desert in different levels in order to make the game more challenging and interesting. The player also has the option of playing a "continuous shift" where there are no levels or story. Players just continue to play to see how much money they can earn.

At certain levels in the game, Flo hires an assistant. In these levels, the only goal is to make more money than her assistant. It incorporates a new element of friendly competition into the game instead of always going against the clock.

Expansion Packs 
There are three themed expansion packs that can be bought separately, also featuring Flo & Grandma:

Seasonal Snack Pack: Coral Cove Cafe, Crypt Cafe, Hometown Harvest, Winter Wonderland & Romantic Rendezvous
Flo Through Time: The Caveman Cafe, Pharaoh's Feast, All Knight Diner, Buccaneer Bistro & Snack to the Future
Once Upon a Diner: 1001 Bites, Through the Cooking Glass, Fee Fi Flo Fun, The Dash Slipper & Munchkin Lunchkin

See also 
 Diner Dash

References

External links 
 Official site
 Official game series site

2007 video games
Action video games
Games built with Playground SDK
MacOS games
Video games about food and drink
Video games developed in the United States
Video games featuring female protagonists
Video games scored by Adam Gubman
Video games set in zoos
Windows games
PlayFirst games